Ptilobactrum is a genus of hoverflies, with one known species, Ptilobactrum neavei. They have very broad heads and their basoflagellomeres are elongate and densely pilose in males.

Biology
Larvae are found in ant nests.

Distribution
P. neavei is native to the African tropics.

References

Hoverfly genera
Monotypic Diptera genera
Microdontinae
Diptera of Africa
Taxa named by Mario Bezzi